Gunnar Utterberg (28 November 1942 – 12 September 2021) was a Swedish sprint canoer from Jönköping. He competed in 1000 m doubles and fours at the 1964, 1968 and 1972 Olympics and won a gold medal in the doubles event in 1964. He also won three silver medals at the European championships in 1967 and 1969. He died in September 2021, at the age of 78.

References

External links

1942 births
2021 deaths
People from Jönköping
Canoeists at the 1964 Summer Olympics
Canoeists at the 1968 Summer Olympics
Canoeists at the 1972 Summer Olympics
Olympic canoeists of Sweden
Olympic gold medalists for Sweden
Swedish male canoeists
Olympic medalists in canoeing
Medalists at the 1964 Summer Olympics
Sportspeople from Jönköping County